Seilda Ikramovich Baishakov (born 28 August 1950) is a retired Soviet professional football player.

Baishakov played seven seasons in the Soviet Top League and made nearly 300 league appearances for FC Kairat during his career.

International career
Baishakov made his debut for USSR on 30 April 1977 in a 1978 FIFA World Cup qualifier against Hungary.

Manager
He has managed FC Kairat

External links
  Profile

1950 births
Living people
Soviet footballers
Soviet Union international footballers
Kazakhstani footballers
FC Kairat players
FC Taraz players
Association football defenders